Ernest Burton (2 September 1921 – July 1999) was an English professional footballer who played as a winger in the Football League for York City, in non-League football for Atlas & Norfolk Works, and was on the books of Sheffield Wednesday without making a league appearance.

References

1921 births
Footballers from Sheffield
1999 deaths
English footballers
Association football forwards
Forgemasters Sports & Social F.C. players
Sheffield Wednesday F.C. players
York City F.C. players
English Football League players